In mathematics, Carathéodory's theorem may refer to one of a number of results of Constantin Carathéodory:

Carathéodory's theorem (conformal mapping), about the extension of conformal mappings to the boundary
Carathéodory's theorem (convex hull), about the convex hulls of sets in Euclidean space
Carathéodory's existence theorem, about the existence of solutions to ordinary differential equations
Carathéodory's extension theorem, about the extension of a measure
Carathéodory–Jacobi–Lie theorem, a generalization of Darboux's theorem in symplectic topology
Carathéodory's criterion, a necessary and sufficient condition for a measurable set
Carathéodory kernel theorem, a geometric criterion for local uniform convergence of univalent functions 
Borel–Carathéodory theorem, about the boundedness of a complex analytic function
Vitali–Carathéodory theorem, a result in real analysis

Mathematics disambiguation pages